Psychological torture or mental torture is a type of torture that relies primarily on psychological effects, and only secondarily on any physical harm inflicted. Although not all psychological torture involves the use of physical violence, there is a continuum between psychological torture and physical torture. The two are often used in conjunction with one another and often overlap in practice, with the fear and pain induced by physical torture often resulting in long-term psychological effects, and many forms of psychological torture involving some form of pain or coercion.

United Nations Convention against Torture

The Convention against Torture and Other Cruel, Inhuman or Degrading Treatment or Punishment (commonly known as the United Nations Convention against Torture) is an international human rights treaty, under the review of the United Nations, that aims to prevent torture and other acts of cruel, inhuman, or degrading treatment or punishment around the world. The Convention requires states to take effective measures to prevent torture in any state under their jurisdiction, and forbids states to transport people to any country where there is a reason to believe torture could occur.

The text of the Convention was adopted by the United Nations General Assembly on 10 December 1984 and, following ratification by the 20th state party, it came into force on 26 June 1987. 26 June is now recognized as the International Day in Support of Victims of Torture, in honor of the Convention. As of May 2015, the Convention has 158 state parties.

The Convention gave for the first time in history a definition of psychological torture:

The Optional Protocol to such Convention (OPCAT, 2006) is an important addition to the United Nations Convention. The Committee Against Torture (CAT) is a body of independent experts that monitors implementation of the Convention by State parties. All-State parties are obliged under the Convention to submit regular reports to the CAT on how the rights are being implemented. Upon ratifying the Convention, States must submit a report within one year, after which they are obliged to report every four years. The Committee examines each report and addresses its concerns and recommendations to the State party in the form of "concluding observations". Under certain circumstances, the CAT may consider complaints or communications from individuals claiming that their rights under the Convention have been violated. The CAT usually meets in May and November each year in Geneva.

A contemporary definition of psychological torture are those processes that "involve attacking or manipulating the inputs and processes of the conscious mind that allow the person to stay oriented in the surrounding world, retain control and have the adequate conditions to judge, understand and freely make decisions which are the essential constitutive ingredients of an unharmed self". The Torturing Environment Scale is the first scale to measure Torturing Environments based on this model.

Types of psychological torture

Many forms of psychological torture methods attempt to destroy the subject's normal self-image by removing them from any kind of control over their environment, isolation, monopolising of perception, impression of almightiness, creating a state of learned helplessness, psychological regression and depersonalization. Other techniques include humiliation, forced nudity and head shaving, exhausting by sleep deprivation, hooding and other forms of sensory deprivation.

A strictly fear-inducing method is the mock execution. Various threats operate on the same fear-inducing principle.

Another method is indirect torture, in which a victim is forced to witness the torture of another person, often a loved one. This preys on the victim's affection for and loyalty to a partner, relative, friend, comrade-in-arms, etc, whose real pain induces vicarious suffering in the targeted psychological victim, who is thus loaded with guilt but spared physical harm that might affect their ability to comply.

The publicly known systematics was developed in 1956 by the American psychiatrist Albert Biderman who examined several U.S. soldiers tortured by North Korean and Chinese secret services during the Korean war. He defined three basic actions to break the victims as dependence, debility, and dread. His work was further developed for the CIA.

Effect of torture

While psychological torture may not leave any lasting physical damage—indeed, this is often one of the motivations for using psychological rather than physical torture—it can result in similar levels of permanent mental damage to its victims.

Psychological torture methods were devised by, and in conjunction with, doctors and psychologists. Medical participation in torture has taken place throughout the world and was a prominent feature of the US interrogation practice in military and Central Intelligence Agency (CIA)  facilities.

Incidents of torture
The United States made extensive use of psychological torture techniques at Guantanamo Bay and other sites subsequent to the 9/11 attacks. Many other countries have been accused of using psychological torture, including Iran.

See also
Chinese water torture
Gaslighting
KUBARK
Psychological torture methods
Psychology of torture
Torture
United Nations Convention against Torture
White torture

References

Torture
Psychological abuse
Psychological torture techniques